Moving Walls is the ninth solo album by Matthew Good. The album was previewed with a single, "Sicily", which was released on October 18, 2019, with an accompanying music video. A second single, "Selling You My Heart", was released on January 24, 2020, with the album following on February 21, 2020.

Background
The album was recorded after Good's divorce and during the time he was living at his parents house. He had gone to help his mum with his dad who has dementia and cancer. Good would work from eight in the evening, until 3:00 am the following morning, demoing songs in his parents garage. Some of the effects from the demos ended up on the album; on "Dreading it", the acoustic strumming at the start of the song is Good's daughter, Elizabeth trying the guitar, and the rain on "Fingernails" is as recorded hitting Good's parent's garage door.

In a press release, Good himself described the album as "sumptuous, orchestral, and wildly multifaceted." The album was recorded with Warne Livesey, a long-time collaborator with Good, at the Bathouse Studio in Ontario. One of the songs on the album, "Lumiére Noire", is sung entirely in French, something which Good ashamedly admits that he picked up when touring around Europe rather than from his own country.

Reception
Rob Miller, writing in the Pop Topic, described the album as "...a haunting and cinematic piece of art," and "Good's strongest solo record to date." Jenny Aquino, writing in "Exclaim", said that; "While the sheer number of sombre songs make it a rather dreary listen, its thought-provoking lyrics make it worthwhile..."

Tracklisting

Personnel
Matthew Good - vocals, acoustic guitars, synth, electric guitar
Blake Manning - drums, percussion, backing vocals
Peter Fusco - bass
Stuart Cameron - electric guitar, 12 sting acoustic guitar, lap steel, pedal steel
Warne Livesey - piano, omnichord, harmonium, organ, Moog bass, mellotron
Timothy Dawson - double bass
Terry Townson - trumpet, flugelhorn
Elizabeth Good - acoustic guitar on Dreading it
Andée Leclerc - backing vocals
Hayley Mather - backing vocals

Charts

References

External links
Moving Walls lyrics page on matthewgood.org

2020 albums
Matthew Good albums
Albums produced by Warne Livesey